Kukeri (singular: kuker, кукер) are elaborately costumed Bulgarian men, who perform traditional rituals intended to scare away evil spirits. This Bulgarian tradition has been practiced since Thracian times and is of a Thracian origin.

Closely related traditions are found throughout the Balkans and Greece (including Romania and the Pontus). The costumes cover most of the body and include decorated wooden masks of animals (sometimes double-faced) and large bells attached to the belt. Around New Year and before Lent, the kukeri walk and dance through villages to scare away evil spirits with their costumes and the sound of their bells. They are also believed to provide a good harvest, health, and happiness to the village during the year.

The kukeri traditionally visit peoples' houses at night so that "the sun would not catch them on the road." After parading around the village, they usually gather at the village square to dance wildly and amuse the people. Kukeri rituals vary by region, but remain largely the same in essence.

Distribution and etymology

The custom is generally thought to be related to the Thracian Dionysos cult in the wider area of Thracia and similar rituals can also be found in much of the Balkans. 

The term could be derived from Proto-Slavic  ("evil spirit") with the agentive suffix  (i.e. literally meaning a "chaser of evil spirits"), or from a pre-Slavic divinity named Kuk.

Kukeri

Kukeri is a divinity personifying fecundity. Sometimes in Bulgaria and Serbia it is a plural divinity. In Bulgaria, a ritual spectacle of spring (a sort of carnival) takes place after a scenario of folk theatre, in which Kuker's role is interpreted by a man attired in a sheep- or goat-pelt, wearing a horned mask and girded with a large wooden phallus. During the ritual, various physiological acts are interpreted, including the sexual act, as a symbol of the god's sacred marriage, while the symbolical wife, appearing pregnant, mimes the pains of giving birth. This ritual inaugurates the labors of the fields (ploughing, sowing) and is carried out with the participation of numerous allegorical personages, among which is the Emperor and his entourage.

Capra
Capra comes from the Latin capra, meaning goat. A halo like head piece was worn as a crown to symbolize the spiritual divine realm, while fur, feathers and other external body-parts of an animal attached to represent the natural world. The fact that nature has good and evil, and that humans are the intermediary between spirit and nature. It was a time to pay homage to the Spieth gods. Some cultures imbibed in human flesh to satiate the god's thirst for blood, as an act of solidarity for the gods.

Kukeri in the media
Kukeri or Kuker Warriors are some of the main characters in the epic fantasy animated series The Golden Apple, which is currently being developed by Studio Zmei. In it, young brothers Bran and Vlad have been trained as Kuker Warriors to fight evil spirits, but they have to question what they have been taught when they are forced to team up with half-spirit Vihra and Samodiva-spirit Tina in order to protect their world.

Kukeri are featured in the music video for the song "Fish on", by the industrial metal band Lindemann, and in the film Toni Erdmann, directed by Maren Ade.

Gallery

See also

 Acta Dasii
 Phallic processions
 Kourbania
 Careto
 The Kukeri Nunataks, rock formations on Livingston Island in the South Shetland Islands, Antarctica are named after the Bulgarian Kukeri.
 Slavic carnival
 
 
 
 Survakane

References

External links
 
 http://kukeriwines.com/
 http://www.surva-bg.com/
 http://www.kukerlandia.com/en/

Bulgarian folklore
Romanian folklore
Serbian folklore
Greek folklore
Cult of Dionysus
Thrace
Sexuality and society
Ritual animal disguise
Slavic carnival